Isotomidae is a family of elongate-bodied springtails in the order Entomobryomorpha.

Genera
These 109 genera belong to the family Isotomidae:

 Aackia Yosii, 1966
 Acanthomurus Womersley, 1934 c g
 Aggressopygus Potapov & Babenko, 2014 g
 Agrenia Boerner, 1906 i g b
 Antarcticinella Salmon, 1965 g
 Antarctophorus Potapov, 1992 i c g
 Anurophorus Nicolet, 1842 i c g b
 Appendisotoma Stach, 1947 g
 Araucanocyrtus Massoud & Rapoport, 1968
 Archisotoma Linnaniemi, 1912 i c g
 Arlea Womersley, 1939
 Axelsonia Boener, 1906 i c g
 Ballistura Börner, 1906 c g b
 Biacantha Martynova, 1971 g
 Blissia Rusek, 1985 i c g
 Bonetrura Christiansen and Bellinger, 1980 i c g
 Burmisotoma Christiansen & Nascimbene, 2006 g
 Coloburella Latzel, 1918 i c g
 Cryptopygus Willem, 1901 i c g
 Cylindropygus Deharveng, Potapov & Bedos, 2005 i c g
 Dagamaea Yosii, 1965 b
 Degamaea Yosii, 1965 i c g
 Desoria Agassiz & Nicolet, 1841 c g b
 Dimorphacanthella Potapov, Bu, Huang, Gao & Luan, 2010 g
 Dimorphotoma Grinbergs, 1975 g
 Ephemerotoma  g
 Folsomia Willem, 1902 i c g b
 Folsomides Stach, 1922 i c g
 Folsomina Denis, 1931 i c g
 Folsomotoma  c g
 Gnathisotoma Cassagnau, 1957 g
 Gnathofolsomia Deharveng & Christian, 1984 g
 Gressittacantha Wise, 1967 i c g
 Guthriella Börner, 1906 g b
 Halisotoma  c g
 Haploisotoma Izarra, 1965 i c g
 Hemisotoma Bagnall, 1949 i c g
 Heteroisotoma Stach, 1947 g
 Hydroisotoma Stach, 1947 g b
 Isotoma Bourlet, 1839 i c g b
 IsotomediaSalmon, 1944 c g
 Isotomiella Bagnall, 1939 i c g b
 Isotomina  g
 Isotomodella Martynova, 1968 i c g
 Isotomodes Axelson, 1907 i c g
 Isotomurus Boerner, 1903 i c g b
 Isotopenola Potapov, Babenko, Fjellberg & Greenslade, 2009 g
 Jesenikia Rusek, 1997 i c g
 Jestella Najt, 1978
 Kaylathalia Stevens & D'Haese, 2016 g
 Marisotoma Fjellberg, 1997 g
 Martynovella Deharveng, 1978 g
 Metisotoma Maynard, 1951 i c g b
 Micranurophorus Bernard, 1977 i c g
 Micrisotoma Bellinger, 1952 i c g
 Millsia Womersley, 1942
 Mucracanthus Stebaeva, 1976
 Mucronia Fjellberg g
 Mucrosomia Bagnall, 1949 i c g
 Mucrotoma Rapoport & Rubio, 1963 i c g
 Myopia Chrisiansen & Bellinger, 1980 g
 Narynia Martynova, 1967 g
 Neocryptopygus Salmon, 1965 i c g
 Neophorella Womersley, 1934
 Octodontophora Chelnokov, 1990
 Pachyotoma Bagnall, 1949 g
 Papillomurus  c g
 Paracerura Deharveng & de Olivei, 1994 g
 Parafolsomia Salmon, 1949 g
 Parisotoma Bagnall, 1940 c g b
 Pectenisotoma Gruia, 1983 i c g
 Pentacanthella Deharveng, 1979
 ProceruraSalmon, 1941 c g
 Proctostephanus Börner, 1902 i c g
 Proisotoma Börner, 1901 i c g b
 Proisotomurus  c g
 Propachyotoma Christiansen & Nascimbene, 2006 g
 Protodesoria Christiansen & Nascimbene, 2006 g
 Protoisotoma Christiansen & Pike, 2002 g
 Psammisotoma Greenslade & Deharveng, 1986 g
 Pseudanurophorus Stach, 1922 i c g
 Pseudisotoma Handschin, 1924 g b
 Pseudofolsomia Martynova, 1967 g
 Pteronychella Börner, 1909
 Rhodanella Salmon, 1945 i c g
 Sahacanthella Potapov & Stebaeva, 1994
 Salmonia Baijal, 1958
 Scutisotoma Bagnall, 1949 g b
 Secotomodes Potapov, 1988
 Semicerura Maynard, 1951 i c g
 Sericeotoma Potapov, 1991 g
 Setocerura Salmon, 1949 c g
 Sibiracanthella Potapov & Stebaeva, 1995 i c g
 Skadisotoma  g
 SpinoceruraSalmon, 1941 c g
 Stachanorema Wray, 1957 i c g
 Strenzketoma Potapov & al., 2006 g
 Subisotoma  g
 Tetracanthella Schött, 1891 i c g
 Tiancanthella Rusek, 1979
 Tibiolatra Salmon, 1941 c g
 Tomocerura Wahlgren, 1901 c g
 Tuvia Grinbergs, 1962 i c g
 Uzelia Absolon, 1901 i c g
 Vertagopus Börner, 1906 g b
 Villusisotoma Christiansen & Nascimbene, 2006 g
 Weberacantha Christiansen, 1951 i c g
 Womersleyella Salmon, 1944 i c g
 Yosiiella Hüther, 1967 i c g

Data sources: i = ITIS, c = Catalogue of Life, g = GBIF, b = Bugguide.net

References

Collembola
Arthropod families